Sysax Multi Server is a Secure FTP Server and a SSH2 Secure Shell Server for the Windows operating system. Web browser-based secure HTTPS file transfers and Telnet access is also supported. The software is certified for Windows Vista, and tested to be compatible with Windows 7/8. The software is also certified for Windows Server 2012 and runs on all 32 and 64 bit editions of Windows including Windows Server 2008. The Personal edition of the software which includes SSH2/SFTP support is free for non-commercial use.

Features 
 Protocols supported include FTP, FTPS, SFTP, HTTP, HTTPS, Telnet, and Secure Shell
 Authentication mechanisms include Windows/LDAP Active Directory, ODBC, and local server accounts
 Remote web browser based administration
 Encryption with SSL/TLS (for FTPS) and SSH2 (for SFTP)
 Supports file resuming for both uploads and downloads
 Server triggers and scripting for events such as failed login and file upload or download
 File integrity verification using CRC32, MD5, and SHA1
 Support for automatic IP blocking for failed logins
 Support for High Availability/Failover and Windows Clustering
 Runs as a Windows Service
 Certified for Windows Vista
 Compatible with Windows Server 2008, Windows 7, and Windows 8 
 Certified for Windows Server 2012

See also 
List of FTP server software
Comparison of FTP server software
Sysax FTP Automation

References

External links
Official website
Sysax Multi Server User Forum
Sysax Multi Server FAQ

FTP server software